In the run up to the 2025 Norwegian parliamentary election, various organisations carry out opinion polling to gauge voting intention in Norway. The date range for these opinion polls are from the 2021 Norwegian parliamentary election, held on 13 September, to the present day. Unlike most nations, Norway's constitution does not allow early elections before the four-year term limit.

Poll results 
There are several websites tracking party support ahead of the election, using somewhat different methods.

Graphical summary

2023

2022

2021

By county

Finnmark

Nord-Trøndelag

Oppland

Oslo

Sogn og Fjordane

Sør-Trøndelag

Troms

See also 
Opinion polling for the 2021 Norwegian parliamentary election

References

External links 
List of polls on Pollofpolls.no 
List of poll on Politico

Opinion polling in Norway
Norway